Pretty Boy Floyd is a 1960 biographical film based on the career of the notorious 1930s outlaw Charles Arthur "Pretty Boy" Floyd.

The film was an independent production, written and directed by Herbert J. Leder and produced by Monroe Sachson. The role of Pretty Boy Floyd was played by John Ericson and the rest of the cast included Barry Newman, Joan Harvey, Carl York, Roy Fant and a young Peter Falk in a minor role.

Plot

Cast
John Ericson as Charles Arthur "Pretty Boy" Floyd
Barry Newman as Al Riccardo
Joan Harvey as Lil Courtney
Carl York as Curly Winwell
Roy Fant as Jed Watkins
Jason Evers as Sheriff Blackie Faulkner
Peter Falk as Shorty Walters
Al Lewis as Machine Gun Manny
Norman Burton as Bill Courtney
Philip Kenneally as Baker

External links
 

1960 films
1960 crime drama films
American crime drama films
American independent films
Biographical films about Depression-era gangsters
American black-and-white films
Films directed by Herbert J. Leder
Cultural depictions of Pretty Boy Floyd
1960 directorial debut films
1960 independent films
1960s English-language films
1960s American films